James Chibuzor Obiorah (born 24 August 1978) is a Nigerian former footballer who played as a midfielder.

Club career
His previous clubs include RSC Anderlecht, Grasshopper Zurich, Cádiz CF, Grazer AK and Lokomotiv Moscow and he was also loaned to Niort from Lokomotiv Moscow in the 2004–05 season, scoring 4 goals in 12 games. In 2007, he played for Kaduna United F.C., after being released from his contract with French Ligue 2 side Niort. In August 2008 he moved from Kaduna United F.C. to SC Toulon.

International career
Obiorah was the captain of the Nigeria side that reached the quarter-finals of the 1995 FIFA U-17 World Championship and also played for the Nigeria national football team 3 times, including being called up for the 2002 FIFA World Cup, scoring 1 goal.

References

External links 
 Obiorah profile at cadistas1910.com 

1978 births
Living people
Nigerian footballers
Nigeria international footballers
2002 FIFA World Cup players
FC Lokomotiv Moscow players
Grasshopper Club Zürich players
R.S.C. Anderlecht players
La Liga players
Cádiz CF players
Chamois Niortais F.C. players
Grazer AK players
Enyimba F.C. players
SC Toulon players
Belgian Pro League players
Russian Premier League players
Kaduna United F.C. players
Sportspeople from Jos
Association football midfielders